Sneijder is a surname. Notable people with the surname include:

 Jeffrey Sneijder (born 1982), Dutch footballer
 Rodney Sneijder (born 1991), Dutch footballer
 Wesley Sneijder (born 1984), Dutch footballer

Occupational surnames
Dutch-language surnames